Events in the year 2001 in Burkina Faso.

Incumbents 

 President: Blaise Compaoré
 Prime Minister: Paramanga Ernest Yonli

Events 

 December – The summit meeting of ECOWAS was set to convene with President Konare of Mali as executive chairman.

Deaths

References 

 
2000s in Burkina Faso
Years of the 21st century in Burkina Faso
Burkina Faso
Burkina Faso